Lewis Ochoa may refer to:

 Lewis Ochoa (Colombian footballer) (born 1984), Colombian football right-back
 Lewis Ochoa (English footballer) (born 1991), English football midfielder